Furry is a populated place located in Sunflower County, Mississippi, on Mississippi Highway 3.

References

Former populated places in Sunflower County, Mississippi
Former populated places in Mississippi